Sadra Shiraz Futsal Club was an Iranian futsal club based in Shahrak-e-Sadra, Shiraz.

Season-by-season 
The table below chronicles the achievements of the Club in various competitions.

Honors 

 Shiraz Province League
 Runners-up (1): 1997

Notable players

Managers

References

External links 
 

Futsal clubs in Iran
Sport in Shiraz
1995 establishments in Iran
Defunct futsal clubs in Iran
2013 disestablishments in Iran
Futsal clubs established in 1995
Sports clubs disestablished in 2013